Keith Hanvey (born 18 January 1952) is an English retired professional footballer who played for Manchester City, Swansea City, Rochdale, Grimsby Town and Huddersfield Town. His Debut for  Manchester City appearance, in a Texaco Cup match against Airdrie on 27 September 1971.

References

1952 births
Living people
Footballers from Manchester
English footballers
English Football League players
Association football defenders
Manchester City F.C. players
Swansea City A.F.C. players
Rochdale A.F.C. players
Grimsby Town F.C. players
Huddersfield Town A.F.C. players